Cupidopsis is a genus of Afrotropical butterflies in the family Lycaenidae.

Species
Cupidopsis cissus (Godart, [1824])
Cupidopsis iobates (Hopffer, 1855)

External links
Cupidopsis at Markku Savela's website on Lepidoptera

Polyommatini
Lycaenidae genera